Muhammad al-Sufi (1927 – 19 November 2018) was a field marshal in the Syrian Army, who played a role in the 1963 Syrian coup d'état and briefly served as Defense Minister between March and May of that year. Politically a Nasserist, he was sidelined by Ba'athist rivals in the military and departed the political scene before returning to Syria in the 1990s.

Career and role in 1963 events
In 1948 Sufi graduated from the Homs Military Academy, and in the early 1960s he served as the army's brigade in Homs, central Syria. A staunch supporter of Egypt's president and leading pan-Arabist, Gamal Abdel Nasser, he opposed Syria's secession from the United Arab Republic (a union with Egypt) in 1961. He was not alone and by mid-1962 a loose unionist coalition was formed among officer corps bringing together Nasserists, led by Sufi and Rashid al-Qutaini, Ba'athists led by the Military Committee and political independents led by Ziad al-Hariri. The unionists planned a coup to toppled the secessionist government of Nazim al-Kudsi and Khalid al-Azm.

While it was eventually decided that the planned coup be implemented on 9 March, Sufi and Qutaini proposed to Hariri on 5 March that the plan be postponed until 11 March. Their stated intention to further ensure unionist control over more army units so as to avoid any violence during the coup. Their non-Nasserist counterparts viewed this as an attempt by Sufi and the Nasserists to launch their own coup at a later time and according to Syria expert Itamar Rabinovich, the Nasserists, who were the largest single faction among the unionist officers and maintained a significant level of popular support due to their association with President Nasser, likely feared being sidelined by the Ba'athists and the independents should the coup have gone as planned. Nonetheless, the coup was not delayed and was launched earlier on the night of 7 March, succeeding by the morning 8 March. Sufi and Qutaini were taken off guard and rushed to join the insurrection, playing relatively minor roles.

The new government took place under the leadership of the National Council for the Revolutionary Command (NCRC), which was dominated by the Ba'athists. The NCRC had chosen Lu'ay al-Atassi as president and co-founder of the Ba'ath Party, Salah al-Din Bitar, as Prime Minister. Bitar appointed Sufi as Defense Minister, although most of the cabinet's portfolio's were primarily assigned to Ba'athists and other loyalists. Tensions began to develop between the Nasserists and the Ba'athists towards the end of month and increased tremendously when the former viewed the latter as reneging on a unity agreement signed with Egypt and Iraq on 17 April. The situation culminated with a mass purging of Nasserist officers beginning on 28 April, prompting Sufi to resign from the defense ministry and the NCRC in protest. He had been in Beirut, Lebanon when he declared his resignation. Following a failed coup attempt by Nasserists led by colonels Jassem Alwan and Raef al-Maarri, Sufi was arrested and tried in a military court which sentenced him to life imprisonment for alleged participation in anti-government activity. He was released in December 1964, as part of wider amnesty decree that also saw Alwan, Maarri and other alleged conspirators released and exiled. Sufi left Syria sometime after.

Return to Syria
Sufi was invited back to Syria in the spring of 1990 by then-President Hafez al-Assad, who had been a member of the Ba'athist Military Committee at the time of Sufi's resignation. The period marked an opening for Syrian political exiles. After his return, Sufi founded the Nasserite Democratic Arab Party.

Sufi died in Latakia on 19 November 2018.

References

Bibliography

1927 births
2018 deaths
Syrian Arab nationalists
Syrian generals
Syrian ministers of defense
Syrian politicians
People from Latakia